Actinothrips is a genus of thrips in the family Phlaeothripidae.

Species
 Actinothrips apithanus
 Actinothrips bondari
 Actinothrips chiapensis
 Actinothrips femoralis
 Actinothrips fraterculus
 Actinothrips gargantua
 Actinothrips longicornis
 Actinothrips monochaetus
 Actinothrips pedalis
 Actinothrips polychaetus
 Actinothrips regalis
 Actinothrips retanae
 Actinothrips trichaetus

References

Phlaeothripidae
Thrips
Thrips genera